Boro Dampha Kunda is a town in the Gambia. It is located in Wuli District in the Upper River Division. As of 2009, it has an estimated population of 353.

References

Populated places in the Gambia
Upper River Division